Race Horses were a Welsh band based in Cardiff, Wales and originally from Aberystwyth. Formed in 2005 as Radio Luxembourg, they changed their name in 2009 due to possible legal problems with the radio station of the same name. Initially the majority of their music was in Welsh, but their final album Furniture was entirely in English.

After appearing across Wales and during the debut Festival N°6, the band announced their split in January 2013 and performed a farewell gig the following month at Clwb Ifor Bach.

After Race Horses
Gwion Llewelyn has been the drummer for Yr Ods and performs live with Aldous Harding, Baxter Dury, Meilyr Jones, Alys Williams and others. He and Mali Llywelyn both play with Villagers.

Alun Gaffey continues solo as a singer-songwriter. His self-titled debut album came out in 2016 and was nominated for that year's Welsh Music Prize. His second album will be released in 2020.

Dylan Hughes played with the band Endaf Gremlin (2013-2014). He now fronts the band Ynys.

Meilyr Jones played bass with Neon Neon on their 2013 live shows supporting the album Praxis Makes Perfect. He's also collaborated on the Cousins project with Euros Childs, their album released in 2012, and with Stealing Sheep. In 2010-2011 he was involved with Cate Le Bon on the Yoke project. He released his debut solo single, Refugees/Birds, on Moshi Moshi Records in August 2015, and his debut full album, 2013, came out the following March. In November 2016, the album won the 2015-2016 Welsh Music Prize.

Discography
 Diwrnod Efo'r Anifeiliaid (2007 EP by Radio Luxembourg)
 Goodbye Falkenburg (2010)
 Furniture (2012)

References

Welsh indie rock groups
Musical groups from Aberystwyth
Musical groups from Cardiff
Welsh-language bands
Psychedelic pop music groups
Musical groups established in 2005
2005 establishments in Wales